Grebenau is a town in the Vogelsbergkreis in Hesse, Germany.

Geography

Location
Lying from 220 to 350 m above sea level, Grebenau is northeast of the Vogelsberg some 26 km northwest of Fulda, at the place where the Schwarza empties into the Jossa, itself a tributary to the Fulda.

Neighbouring communities
Grebenau borders in the north on the town of Alsfeld and the community of Breitenbach am Herzberg (Hersfeld-Rotenburg), in the east on the town of Schlitz, in the south on the town of Lauterbach, and in the west on the community of Schwalmtal, Hesse.

Constituent communities
Bieben, representative Klaus Gaudl
Merlos – belongs to Bieben
Eulersdorf, representative Ernst Hölscher
Grebenau, representative Lotti Frick
Reimenrod, representative Gerhard Agel
Schwarz, representative Klaus Weitzel
Udenhausen, representative Herbert Schäfer
Wallersdorf, representative Gerd-Dieter Kaiser

Politics

Town council

Chairman:

Herbert Appel (SPD)
CDU: 6 seats, factional chairman Gerd-Dieter Kaiser
SPD: 6 seats, factional chairman Helmut Ihm
FWG (citizens' coalition): 3 seats, factional chairman Rudolf Dippel
(as of municipal elections held on 26 March 2006)

References

Vogelsbergkreis
Grand Duchy of Hesse